Malvina Pastorino (November 16, 1916 in Buenos Aires, Argentina – May 6, 1994 in Buenos Aires, Argentina) was an Argentine film actress.

Career

She appeared in more than 20 film and television productions between 1949 and 1988. She was married to comedy actor Luis Sandrini from June 5, 1980 until her death in 1994, aged 77. She is the mother of actor and film maker Sandra Sandrini.

Partial filmography
 The Seducer of Granada (1953)
 Asunto terminado (1953)
 Chafalonías (1960)
 The Dragonfly Is Not an Insect (1963)
 Los Neuróticos (1971)
 La Valija (1971)
 El Casamiento de Laucha (1977)

External links

 
 , at cinenacional.com. (Spanish)

1916 births
1994 deaths
Argentine film actresses
Argentine television actresses
People from Buenos Aires
Burials at La Chacarita Cemetery
20th-century Argentine actresses